Mammillaria herrerae is a species of plant in the family Cactaceae. It is endemic to Mexico where it is confined to Querétaro. Its habitat is semi-desert shrubland. It is threatened by habitat loss and illegal collection. In a 20-year period over 95% of the species population was illegally collected or sold. Mammillaria herrerae has an IUCN rating of critically endangered.

References

herrerae
Cacti of Mexico
Endemic flora of Mexico
Flora of Querétaro
Taxonomy articles created by Polbot